Michele Mongelli (born 1945) is a man from Turin, Italy, who was arrested on 27 March 2009 for allegedly sexually abusing his daughter over 25 years. His son Giuseppe (born 1968) was also arrested on the allegation of abusing his sister and his own four daughters. Because of the similarities, this case has been compared to the Fritzl case in Austria and the Sheffield incest case in Britain.

The 34-year-old daughter was given the pseudonym of Laura by the Italian press and other media. The victims had been kept in conditions of slavery and mistreatment.

In May 2012 Michele Mongelli has been sentenced to 10 years of prison, and his son Giuseppe sentenced to 9 years.

See also 
List of child abuse cases featuring long-term detention

References

External links
Independent

Living people
1945 births
2009 crimes in Italy
2009 in Italy
Child sexual abuse in Italy
Incest
Rape in Italy
Child abuse incidents and cases